Thirumalai Deivam is a 1973 Indian Tamil-language Hindu mythological film, directed and written by A. P. Nagarajan. The film stars Sivakumar in the title role, with K. B. Sundarambal, T. R. Mahalingam, Srividya, Lakshmi and A. V. M. Rajan in supporting roles.

Plot 
While Lord Srinivasan, an incarnation of Vishnu, faces several obstacles in his path, saint Brughu is also subjected to mockery and humiliation from the people of the kingdom.

Cast 
Actors
 Sivakumar as Lord Vishnu/Srinivasan
 Gemini Ganesan as Agasa Rajan
 R. Muthuraman as King Tondaiman
 A. V. M. Rajan as Narathan
 S. V. Ramadoss as Birugu Munivar
 T. R. Mahalingam as Amudha's Husband
 Suruli Rajan as Rangen, (in Tamil Kuyavan)
 Master Sekhar as Venkatesan
 A. K. Veerasami as Punniyakodi
 V. Gopalakrishnan
 Ennatha Kannaiya as Anumanthu

Actresses
 K. B. Sundarambal as Saint Narayani
 S. Varalakshmi as Vagula malai
 C. R. Vijayakumari as Amutha
 Srividya as Goddess Lakshmi
 Lakshmi as Goddess Padmavati
 Kumari Padmini as Goddess Parvathy
 Manorama as Ramaayee
 Sachu as Pankajavalli
 Pushpalatha as Queen Anandhavalli
 S. N. Parvathy as Dhankodi
 Pushpamala
 Sukumari as Queen
 Acho Chithra as Vellachi

Soundtrack 
Music was composed by Kunnakudi Vaidyanathan and lyrics were written by Kannadasan, K. D. Santhanam, Alangudi Somu, Nellai Arulmani, Poovai Senguttuvan and Ulundhurpettai Shanmugam. The song "Ezhumalai Irukka" is set in the raga Hamsanandi.

References

External links 
 

1970s musical films
1970s Tamil-language films
1973 films
Films about reincarnation
Films about royalty
Films about shapeshifting
Films directed by A. P. Nagarajan
Films scored by Kunnakudi Vaidyanathan
Films set in 1973
Films with screenplays by A. P. Nagarajan
Hindu devotional films
Hindu mythological films
Indian epic films
Indian musical films
Indian nonlinear narrative films
Religious epic films